Wariner or Warriner is a surname. Notable people with the name include:

Sportspeople 
 Alan Warriner-Little (born 1962), English professional darts player
 Ed Wariner (born 1961), American football coach and former player
 Jeremy Wariner (born 1984), American track athlete
 Leroy Warriner (1919–2003), American racing driver
 Michael Warriner (1908–1986), English rower
 Samantha Warriner (born 1971), English-born New Zealander triathlete
 Steve Warriner, English former footballer
 Todd Warriner (born 1974), Canadian ice-hockey forward

Others 
 David Dortch Warriner (1929–1986), United States federal judge
 Doreen Warriner, (1904–1974), British academic and refugee worker in Czechoslovakia in 1938-1939
 E. C. Warriner (1866–1945), American educator 
 Frederic Warriner (1916–1992), American stage actor.
 Frederick Warriner (1884–1966), mayor of Winnipeg in 1937
 John E. Warriner (c.1907–1987), author of the textbook series Warriner's English Grammar and Composition
 Steve Wariner (born 1954), American country-music singer-songwriter
 Tony Warriner (born 1968), English video game designer